Can't Tell Me Nothing: The Official Mixtape is a mixtape by American hip hop artist Kanye West. It was made freely available over the internet on May 27, 2007, in anticipation of the release of his third studio album, Graduation.

Background

The official mixtape was hosted by Kanye West alongside his A&R, Plain Pat. Overall, it is compiled of songs made by various artists signed onto West's G.O.O.D. Music label, collaborations with other unaffiliated musicians, and preview versions of certain songs that would later appear on Graduation. The mixtape was very well received and gave off several tracks that later became successful singles.

Reception
Stylus Magazine awarded Can't Tell Me Nothing an A− rating and complimented it for expressing a high quality in comparison to most promotional mixtapes, claiming, "Even with a few duds, this might be the album of the year." On its general review of the mixtape, Stylus wrote, "Can't Tell Me Nothing is one mixtape that should be legendary on its own, rather than piggybacking off its 'parent' album. It's as diverse as anything I've heard this year, both as intelligent and as stoopid as it wants to be (cf. "Us Placers" vs. "Throw Some D's (Remix)"), and gloriously so." Rock critic Robert Christgau dictated, "Get this while you can from the mixtape man no matter how much of it is destined for the real album." URB wrote, "Although the scatterbrained way Kanye chooses to present himself will continue to face scrutiny and divide opinion, any critic would be hard pressed to deny his talent. Whatever persona he adopts, whether relatively restrained or unsurprisingly in your face, the artist rarely fails to engage." Can't Tell Me Nothing won "Mixtape of the Year" at the 2007 Vibe Awards.

Track listing

See also
Kanye West discography (disambiguation)
Kanye West production discography

References

Albums produced by Kanye West
Kanye West albums
2007 mixtape albums